Musical chairs, also known as Trip to Jerusalem, is a game of elimination involving players, chairs, and music. It is a staple of many parties worldwide.

Gameplay 
A set of chairs is arranged with one fewer chair than the number of players (for example, seven players would use six chairs). While music plays, the contestants walk around the set of chairs. When the music stops abruptly, all players must find their own individual chair to occupy. The player who fails to sit on a chair is eliminated. A chair is then removed for the next round, and the process repeats until only one player remains and is declared the winner.

In Wales, musical chairs had a similar custom to the modern version, with slight differences; the boys would always sit whilst the girls would skip around, always outnumbering the boys. If a girl didn't sit fast enough on the boy's lap, she would have to forfeit. This would continue until the end when the winning girl would kiss the last boy.

History of the name 

The origins of the game's name as "Trip to Jerusalem" is disputed. However, it is known to come from its German name Reise Nach Jerusalem ("The Journey to Jerusalem"). One theory suggests that the name was inspired by the Crusades, wherein several heavy losses were incurred. Another theory suggests that it was inspired by the Aliyah, the immigration of Jews from the diaspora to the Land of Israel (which includes the modern State of Israel), wherein it is stated that spaces on ships taking the Jews to the said land were limited. None of these theories were officially confirmed.

As metaphor
The term "playing musical chairs" is also a metaphor for describing any activity where items or people are repeatedly and usually pointlessly shuffled among various locations or positions.  It can also refer to a condition where people have to expend time searching for a resource, such as having to travel from one gasoline station to another when there is a shortage. It may also refer to political situations where one leader replaces another, only to be rapidly replaced due to the instability of the governing system (see cabinet reshuffle).

In popular culture 
The game is featured in the musical Evita during the number "The Art of the Possible", and serves as a symbol of Juan Peron's rise to power. During the sequence, Peron and a number of military officers play the game, which the former wins.

See also
 Buggins' turn
 Chinese fire drill
 Hot desking
 Level-coil

References

Party games
Children's games
Metaphors
Outdoor games
Chairs